Littleworth is a hamlet in the Horsham District of West Sussex, England. It lies on the Partridge Green to Maplehurst road 2.9 miles (4.7 km) north of Henfield.

Horsham District
Villages in West Sussex